Mike Hamby (born November 12, 1962) is a former American football defensive end. He played for the Buffalo Bills in 1986.

References

1962 births
Living people
American football defensive ends
Utah State Aggies football players
Buffalo Bills players